Rukmini (Sanskrit: रुक्मिणी) is a Hindu goddess. 

Rukmini may also refer to:

Rukmini (given name)
Rukmini Devi Temple, in Gujarat, India
Rukmini Devi Public School, in north-west Delhi, India
Rukmini Foundation, a Pittsburgh-based non-profit organization 
Krishna Rukmini, a 1988 Indian Kannada-language film
Rukmini Swayamvar, a 1946 Bollywood film

See also
Rukmani (disambiguation)